The Lewis Bridge is a four lane bridge carrying U.S. Route 67 across the Missouri River between St. Louis County and St. Charles County, Missouri.  It replaced an earlier narrow, 2-lane through truss bridge of the same name that ran adjacent to the Bellefontaine Bridge.  

The original bridge was opened in 1927; it was replaced in 1979. The new bridge was rehabilitated in 2006.

See also
 List of crossings of the Missouri River
 Clark Bridge

Bridges of the United States Numbered Highway System
Bridges in Greater St. Louis
Bridges in St. Louis County, Missouri
Bridges in St. Charles County, Missouri
Bridges completed in 1979
Road bridges in Missouri
U.S. Route 67
Bridges over the Missouri River
Girder bridges in the United States

References